Gerhard Waibel (born 17 December 1958) is a former Grand Prix motorcycle road racer from Germany. His best year was in 1987, when he finished third in the 80cc world championship. Waibel won four Grand Prix races during his career.

References 

1958 births
Living people
German motorcycle racers
50cc World Championship riders
125cc World Championship riders
Place of birth missing (living people)
80cc World Championship riders